Mecca for Moderns is the sixth studio album by The Manhattan Transfer.  It was released in 1981 by Atlantic Records.

This album was the highest-charting album to date for the group, peaking on Billboard magazine's Top Pop Catalog Albums chart at No. 22. With this album, the Manhattan Transfer became the first group to win Grammy Awards in both the pop and jazz categories in the same year.

Awards
The song "The Boy from New York City" became their first top 10 hit, reaching #7 on Billboard Magazine's Hot 100 chart. This  song also won the group the Grammy for Best Pop Performance by a Duo or Group With Vocals.

The song "Until I Met You (Corner Pocket)" also earned them a Grammy for Best Jazz Vocal Performance, Duo or Group.

The song "A Nightingale Sang In Berkeley Square" which was arranged by Gene Puerling, won the Grammy Best Vocal Arrangement for Two or More Voices.

The song "Spies In The Night", which incorporates the "James Bond Theme", also charted on Billboard Magazine's Bubbling Under chart, peaking at #103.

Album name
According to Tim Hauser, he picked up the name for this album from a Duke Ellington album entitled Live at the Blue Note 1952.  "While reading the cover, he noticed it said 'The Blue Note was a haven for the smart set, in fact, the real mecca for moderns.'  The group liked the phrase, and it fit well with the album concept."

Track listing

Personnel

The Manhattan Transfer 
 Cheryl Bentyne – vocals
 Tim Hauser – vocals
 Alan Paul – vocals, vocal arrangement (2, 4)
 Janis Siegel – vocals, vocal arrangement (6)

Musicians 
 Victor Feldman – Fender Rhodes (1), acoustic piano (1)
 Jay Graydon – synthesizers (1, 3), guitar (1-4, 8), arrangements (1, 3, 5, 8), horn arrangements (2), rhythm arrangements (2, 4, 6), vocal arrangements (4, 6)
 David Foster – acoustic piano (2, 4, 5), keyboards (5), synthesizers (5)
 Greg Mathieson – organ (3), synthesizers (3)
 Michael Boddicker – synthesizers (4, 8)
 Yaron Gershovsky – acoustic piano (6, 8)
 Milcho Leviev – acoustic piano (7, 8), arrangements (7)
 Steve George – synthesizers (8)
 Steve Lukather – guitar (1, 4, 5)
 Dean Parks – guitar (2, 8)
 Al Viola – guitar (6)
 Abraham Laboriel – bass (1-8)
 Steve Gadd – drums (1, 3-8)
 Mike Baird – drums (2)
 Alex Acuña – percussion (3)
 Andy Narell – cowbell (3), steel drums (3)
 Don Roberts – saxophone (2)
 Tom Scott – saxophone (3), Lyricon (3)
 Richie Cole – saxophone (7)
 Jerry Hey – trumpet (2)
 Bernard Kafka – arrangements (8)
 Gene Puerling – arrangements (9)
 Jon Hendricks – scatting (7)

Production 
 Producer, Remix – Jay Graydon
 Engineer – Joseph Bogan
 Assistant Engineers – Bob Bullock and Deborah Thompson
 Recorded at Dawnbreaker Studios (San Fernando, CA).
 Overdubbed and Mixed at Garden Rake Studios (Studio City, CA).
 Mastered by Bernie Grundman at A&M Studios (Hollywood, CA).
 Musical Contractor – Frank DeCaro
 Art Direction – Steve Arnold, Richard DeGussie and Sarah Richardson.
 Photography – Steve Arnold

References

External links
 The Manhattan Transfer Official Website
 Mecca for Moderns Retrieved from discogs October 16, 2010

1981 albums
The Manhattan Transfer albums
Atlantic Records albums